Rock Creek is a  river in the south central part of the U.S. state of Wyoming. It empties into the Medicine Bow River. The drainage basin of Rock Creek starts high on the north side of the Snowy Range. At the northern base of the range, Rock Creek runs through the town of Arlington and continues on through McFadden and Rock River. From there Rock Creek runs primarily northeasterly before turning to the northwest and meeting with the Medicine Bow River just north of the town of Medicine Bow.

See also
List of Wyoming rivers

References 

Rivers of Wyoming
Rivers of Carbon County, Wyoming